Democratic Gathering is the parliamentary bloc of the Progressive Socialist Party in the Lebanese Parliament. Headed by Taymour Jumblatt, it consists of 9 deputies after the 2018 general election.

References 

Progressive Socialist Party

Parliamentary blocs of Lebanon